Cadena braga, is an American telenovela created and produced by Telemundo 1991.

Cast 
 Carmen Carrasco as Julia Hernández
 Carlos Vives as José Antonio Montellano
 Mara Croatto as Sabrinna Valberde
 Carlota Carretero as Eugenia de Montellano
 Adriana Cataño as Nisa
 Xavier Coronel as Rubén
 Richard Douglas as Kike
 Bernadita García Estmester as Lucida
 Karla Hatton as Adelaida
 Robert Marrero as Carlos 
 Ricardo Montalbán as Marcel
 Víctor Pujols as Nataliel
 Héctor Álvarez as Alberto

External links 
 

Telemundo telenovelas
1991 telenovelas